Qarlung, Charlung (چارلۇڭ يېزىسى; Qia'erlong) is a township of Akto County in Xinjiang Uygur Autonomous Region, China. Located in the southeast of the county, the township covers an area of 3,242 square kilometers with a population of 5,258 (as of 2015). It has 5 administrative villages under its jurisdiction.

Name

The name of Qarlung is from a Turkic language, meaning "the place where the mountains gather". It is named after the confluence of the four narrow valleys.

History
In 1965, Qarlung Commune was established.

In 1967, Qarlung Commune was renamed Wuxing Commune (literally 'Five Star' Commune).

In 1981, Kosrap Commune was created from part of the commune.

In 1984, the commune became Qarlung Township.

On August 27, 2018, Kosrap was merged into Qarlung.

Geography and resources

Qarlung Township is located between 75°09′- 76°02′ east longitude and 37°52′- 38°12′ north latitude, to the south of the county seat Akto Town. It is bordered by Kizilto and Tar townships to the east and south, by Taxkorgan County to the west. Its maximum distance is 58 kilometers from west to east and 45 kilometers from north to south. It has a total area of 3,242 square meters with arable land area of 75.04 hectares and artificial grassland area of 77.89 hectares. The seat of the township is 210 kilometers away from Akto Town.

The annual average temperature is 1.9 ℃, the average temperature in January is -12.1 ℃, and the average temperature in July is 12.2 ℃. The annual precipitation is 150–200 mm, the frost-free period is 120 days.

There are precious animals such as snowcock, yellow sheep and argali in the territory, and mineral resources such as coal, crystal, gold, iron, lead and zinc. There are two water systems of Qarlung River and the Kesrevati River, and the Pashrevati Yikbulak Hot Spring with a water temperature of 40-50 °C is a sulfur spring, which can help treat skin diseases.

Administrative divisions

The township has 5 administration villages and unincorporated villages .

5 administration villages:
 Jilande Village (جىلاندى كەنت; Jilangde) 
 Kayiz Village (Kayizi)
 Mazaoz Village (Mazhawozi, Mazhawozicun) 
 Paldalingoz Village (Baledalingwozi)
 Toylublung Village (Tuoyilubulong)

Unincorporated villages
 Koyjol
 Janbulak 

Economy
, as part of the larger poverty alleviation campaign, herdsman residents were given the materials to plant farms. It was reported that 162 herdsmen in Qarlung had been made responsible for about 12,000 cows and 19,000 sheep belonging to 847 households. According to Hou Zhenqi, Party chief of Akto's Qarlung township, all impoverished people in the township had been moved to a new residential compound, a policy which began implementation in 2017. The compound houses 6,593 impoverished people from 1,656 households.

Demographics

, the population of Qarlung was 99.9% Kyrgyz.

References 

Township-level divisions of Akto County